Alfonso González is a Mexican former professional tennis player.

Born in Monterrey, González was active on the professional tour during the 1980s and had a career high singles ranking of 229 in the world. He featured in the main draw of the French Open as a doubles player.

González, a Mexican national champion in 1983, represented his country in a 1984 Davis Cup tie against Venezuela in Caracas, playing two rubbers. His doubles win, partnering Fernando Pérez Pascal, secured the tie for Mexico and he then won a reverse singles over Iñaki Calvo.

Now a resident of Belgium, González is married to Belgian Federation Cup player Kathleen Schuurmans.

See also
List of Mexico Davis Cup team representatives

References

External links
 
 
 

Year of birth missing (living people)
Living people
Mexican male tennis players
Immigrants to Belgium
Sportspeople from Monterrey